Boardman Township is a civil township of Kalkaska County in the U.S. state of Michigan. As of the 2020 census, the township population was 1,479.

Communities 
It was founded and platted by Peter Duthie, David E. and Anna Meek, and John S. and Sarah Harper. They named it for E. Crofton Fox, from whom they had bought the land. A post office operated from October 1875 to November 1884 and again from March 1886 until January 1909. It was a station on the Grand Rapids and Indiana Railroad.
 South Boardman is an unincorporated community and census-designated place near the center of the township.

Geography

US Highway 131 runs diagonally northeast–southwest through the township.

Demographics
As of the census of 2000, there were 1,373 people, 484 households, and 378 families residing in the township. There were 630 housing units at an average density of 17.5 per square mile (6.8/km2). The racial makeup of the township was 97.74% White, 0.15% African American, 1.02% Native American, 0.22% Asian, and 0.87% from two or more races. Hispanic or Latino of any race were 0.66% of the population.

There were 484 households, out of which 40.1% had children under the age of 18 living with them, 61.6% were married couples living together, 11.0% had a female householder with no husband present, and 21.9% were non-families. 16.7% of all households were made up of individuals, and 5.4% had someone living alone who was 65 years of age or older. The average household size was 2.84 and the average family size was 3.11.

In the township the population was spread out, with 30.4% under the age of 18, 7.4% from 18 to 24, 31.8% from 25 to 44, 20.1% from 45 to 64, and 10.3% who were 65 years of age or older. The median age was 34 years. For every 100 females, there were 100.1 males. For every 100 females age 18 and over, there were 94.9 males.

The median income for a household in the township was $35,850, and the median income for a family was $37,115. Males had a median income of $30,438 versus $19,118 for females. The per capita income for the township was $14,123. About 9.3% of families and 13.7% of the population were below the poverty line, including 19.1% of those under age 18 and 6.3% of those age 65 or over.

References 

Townships in Kalkaska County, Michigan
Traverse City micropolitan area
Townships in Michigan